Bravo, My Life (lit. "I Love You, Mal-soon"), also known as Mommy, Dearest, is a 2005 South Korean film directed by Park Heung-sik about an adolescent boy who starts to come of age in the late 70s and early 80s, largely oblivious to the dramatic political events occurring around him. The film sold 406,526 tickets nationwide.

Plot
Bravo, My Life! opens in October 1979 with the news of President Park Chung-hee's assassination. But for 14-year-old Gwang-ho, it is more importantly his first day at junior high, where the kids are interested in football and brawling. Gwang-ho's mother, Mal-soon, whose husband is working in Saudi Arabia, devotes everything to her children. Despite a nagging illness, Mal-soon wears heavy make-up as she sells cosmetics door-to-door. Meanwhile, as his sexual awareness increases, Gwang-ho turns his attention and affection to their pretty neighbor Eun-sook, an assistant nurse who is the complete opposite of Gwang-ho's mother. One day, Gwang-ho receives a "good-luck letter." The letter states that unless he immediately writes and sends the same letter to someone else, he will be faced with bad luck. He starts sending it to people around him, but as those people start vanishing, Gwang-ho is racked with guilt, suspecting the letter of luck is the cause of their disappearance.

Cast
 Moon So-ri as Kim Mal-soon
 Lee Jae-eung as Gwang-ho
 Yoon Jin-seo as Eun-sook
 Kim Dong-young as Chul-ho
 Park Yoo-seon as Hye-sook
 Kim Bong-geun
 Lee Han-wi
 Kang Min-hwi as Jae-myung
 Park Myung-shin
 Jung Da-bin
 Lee Kan-hee as Sang-soo's mother

References

External links
 

2005 films
2000s Korean-language films
Films directed by Park Heung-sik (born 1965)
South Korean coming-of-age drama films
2000s coming-of-age drama films
2005 drama films
2000s South Korean films